The Dunkerton Bridge is a historic structure located in Dunkerton, Iowa, United States. The three-span, filled spandrel arch bridge was built by the Marsh Engineering Company of Des Moines in 1909. It replaced an older span at a different location. The bridge served as the major entry point into the town from the north. This bridge was also replaced by a newer bridge to the east, and this span now carries pedestrian traffic between Charma Park and Marble Street into downtown Dunkerton. It was listed on the National Register of Historic Places in 1998.

See also
 
 
 
 
 List of bridges on the National Register of Historic Places in Iowa
 National Register of Historic Places listings in Black Hawk County, Iowa

References

Bridges completed in 1909
Transportation buildings and structures in Black Hawk County, Iowa
National Register of Historic Places in Black Hawk County, Iowa
Road bridges on the National Register of Historic Places in Iowa
Pedestrian bridges in Iowa
Arch bridges in Iowa